Passo di Tartano is a mountain pass that links the village of Tartano in Valtellina with Valleve in Val Brembana. There is not a road that cross the pass, during summer the Pass is a popular destination for hikers. The pass is covered of snow usually form the mid of November to May  and is a destination for off pist skiers. At the pass there are remains of fortifications of Cadorna Line built during World War I.

See also
 List of highest paved roads in Europe
 List of mountain passes

References 

Mountain passes of Italy
Mountain passes of the Alps